The Art of the Netherlands was an influential collection of recordings made by the Early Music Consort of London under the direction of David Munrow and issued in 1976 as a three-disk set.

The recording (SLS 5049) was split into 'Volumes' as follows:
Volume I: Secular Songs – 14 songs/chansons
Volume II: Instrumental Music – 13 pieces & Mass Movements – 5 pieces
Volume III: Motets – 9 pieces

See also
 The Art of Courtly Love David Munrow, 3LP 1973

References

Early Music Consort albums
1976 albums
1970s classical albums